In Greek mythology, Dyrrhachius (Ancient Greek: Δυρράχιος) son of Poseidon and Melissa, daughter of Epidamnus. He was the eponym of the town Dyrrhachium in Illyria.

Notes

References 

 Stephanus of Byzantium, Stephani Byzantii Ethnicorum quae supersunt, edited by August Meineike (1790-1870), published 1849. A few entries from this important ancient handbook of place names have been translated by Brady Kiesling. Online version at the Topos Text Project.

Children of Poseidon
Demigods in classical mythology